Richard Handcock may refer to:

Richard Handcock, 2nd Baron Castlemaine (1767–1840), Irish MP for Athlone 1800–1801
Richard Handcock, 3rd Baron Castlemaine (1791–1861), his son, British MP for Athlone 1826–1832, Irish representative peer
Richard Handcock, 4th Baron Castlemaine (1826–1892), his son, Irish representative peer, Lord Lieutenant of Westmeath
Richard Handcock (priest), Irish Anglican priest